Lipaesthesius leeanus is a species of crab in the family Xanthidae, the only species in the genus Lipaesthesius.

References

Xanthoidea
Monotypic crustacean genera
Decapod genera